Manuel Lao Hernández (born 1944) is a Spanish billionaire, and the founder of Cirsa, Spain's largest casino company.

Hernández was born in Almería in 1944. He is married, with three children, and lives in Matadepera, Spain.

References

1944 births
Living people
Spanish billionaires
20th-century Spanish businesspeople
21st-century Spanish businesspeople